"The Worst" is a song by American hip hop groups Onyx and Wu-Tang Clan. It was released on December 23, 1997 by Tommy Boy as a single from Tommy Boy Records's Ride and as the first single from Onyx's third album, Shut 'Em Down.

Onyx is represented by Fredro Starr, Sonny Seeza and Sticky Fingaz, as well as affiliate X1. Wu-Tang Clan is represented by Method Man, Raekwon, as well as affiliate Killa Sin.

"The Worst" was a minor hit, making it to three different Billboard charts.

Background
The song appeared on the Ride soundtrack. Fredro Starr, Sticky Fingaz and Sonny Seeza also starred in this movie "Ride", which was originally called "I-95". In February 1998, in an interview for MTV, Sticky Fingaz told about collaborating with Wu-Tang:"...It was a collaboration. It's about the worst of the worst, meaning the best. We're the worst nightmare for everyone in hip-hop. When we recording this song in the studio all night, Meth said that he wouldn't leave the studio until this track will be done".

In February 1998, song was also included in a Def Jam's promo release Shut 'Em Down (Exclusive Advance) under the name "Onyx vs. Wu-Tang".

Music video
The music video was directed by Diane Martel and depicts a post-apocalyptic world where rap is banned. The video was filmed in Chinatown, Manhattan, New York City, including shooting in a restaurant Ipoh Garden Malaysian Chinese, and was released on "The BOX" on March 14, 1998.

The video can be found on the 2008's DVD Onyx: 15 Years Of Videos, History And Violence.

Track listing
A-Side:
"The Worst" (radio edit) – 4:55
"The Worst" (instrumental) – 5:37
B-Side:
"The Worst" (album version) – 5:34
"The Worst" (instrumental) – 5:37

Samples
"Up Against the Wall" by Quincy Jones
"Supercalifragilisticexpialidocious" by Julie Andrews and Dick Van Dyke
"Protect Ya Neck" by Wu-Tang Clan
"Step to the Rear" by Brand Nubian
"Chitty Chitty Bang Bang" by Dick Van Dyke and Sally Ann Howes

Personnel 
 Onyx - performer, vocals
 Fredro Starr - performer, vocals
 Sticky Fingaz - performer, vocals
 Sonny Seeza - performer, vocals
 X1 - performer, vocals
 Method Man - performer, vocals
 Raekwon - performer, vocals
 Killa Sin - performer, vocals
 Latief - producer
 Don Elliott - engineer, mixing
 DJ LS One - additional mix engineer, scratches

Charts

References

External links
The Worst at RapGenius
The Worst at Discogs

1998 singles
Onyx (group) songs
Wu-Tang Clan songs
Songs written by Method Man
1997 songs
Tommy Boy Records singles
Posse cuts
Songs written by Raekwon
Music videos directed by Diane Martel